John Wilson Candler (February 10, 1828 – March 16, 1903) was a United States representative from Massachusetts.  He was born in Boston on February 10, 1828.   He attended the Marblehead and Dummer Academies.  He then became a merchant, engaged in shipping and commerce with the East and West Indies and South America. He served as a member of the Massachusetts House of Representatives. He was chairman of the commissioners of prisons of Massachusetts, and president of the Boston Board of Trade and of the Commercial Club of Boston.

Candler married Lucy Almira Cobb on September 1, 1851 in Boston. Cobb was the daughter of Henry and Augusta Adams Cobb. Her mother Augusta, however, had converted to Mormonism in 1832 and abandoned the family in 1843 to marry Brigham Young as his second polygamous wife. After bearing three daughters, Lucy Cobb Candler died in 1855 and John Wilson Candler then married Ida May Garrison of Manhattan in 1867, and they had one daughter.

Candler was elected as a Republican to the Forty-seventh Congress (March 4, 1881 – March 3, 1883).  He was an unsuccessful candidate for reelection in 1882 to the Forty-eighth Congress, but was elected to the Fifty-first Congress (March 4, 1889 – March 3, 1891).  He again was an unsuccessful candidate for reelection in 1890 to the Fifty-second Congress.  He returned to engage in mercantile pursuits until his retirement in 1893.  He died in Providence, Rhode Island on March 16, 1903.  His interment was in Mount Auburn Cemetery in Cambridge, Massachusetts.

References

Toomey,  Daniel P., Massachusetts of today Massachusetts Board of Managers, World's Fair, page 105 (1893).

Republican Party members of the Massachusetts House of Representatives
1828 births
1903 deaths
Republican Party members of the United States House of Representatives from Massachusetts
19th-century American politicians
The Governor's Academy alumni